Holma is a neighbourhood of Malmö, situated in the Borough of Hyllie, Malmö Municipality, Skåne County, Sweden.

Until the 1970s, Holma was mostly farming land. As a result of the Million Programme, the area developed in a short period of time in the beginning of the 1970s, with most buildings completed from 1972 to 1974.

References

Neighbourhoods of Malmö